Zeynababad (also Romanized as Zeynabābād; also known as Zeynābād and Reynābād) is a village in Daland Rural District, in the Central District of Ramian County, Golestan Province, Iran. At the 2006 census, its population was 3,574, in 886 families.

References 

Populated places in Ramian County